Brattle Street, which existed from 1694 to 1962, was a street in Boston, Massachusetts located on the current site of City Hall Plaza, at Government Center.

History

Around 1853, former Virginia slave Anthony Burns worked for "Coffin Pitts, clothing dealer, no.36 Brattle Street." Nearby, abolitionist John P. Coburn managed a clothing store at 20 Brattle Street. In 1850, Joshua Bowen Smith, a black abolitionist and member of Boston's Vigilance Committee, operated a catering business at 16 Brattle Street."

In 1921, the first Radio Shack store opened at 46 Brattle Street.

Gallery

See also
 Brattle Street Church
 John Smibert

References

External links

 Bostonian Society  has materials related to Brattle Street.

Streets in Boston
Former buildings and structures in Boston
1694 establishments in Massachusetts
1962 disestablishments
History of Boston
Financial District, Boston
Government Center, Boston